Bhandara  Taluka, is a Taluka in Bhandara subdivision of Bhandara district in Maharashtra State of India.

References 

Talukas in Maharashtra
Bhandara district